Thomas Gemmell (16 October 1943 – 2 March 2017) was a Scottish football player and manager. Although right-footed, he excelled as a left-sided fullback and had powerful shooting ability. Gemmell is best known as one of the Celtic side who won the 1966–67 European Cup; he scored the first Celtic goal in the final. Gemmell played 18 times for Scotland, and also played for Nottingham Forest, Miami Toros and Dundee. After retiring as a player in 1977, Gemmell managed Dundee and Albion Rovers.

Playing career

Celtic
In October 1961, Gemmell joined Celtic from Coltness United; he signed youth terms on the same day as right winger Jimmy Johnstone, who lived a few miles away and would also have a long association with the club. He was one of the 'Lisbon Lions' who won the 1967 European Cup Final against Inter Milan, a final in which Gemmell scored an equalising goal with a shot from outside the penalty area. Ironically, Gemmell should not have been in position to score the goal, as he had ignored team orders for one full-back to stay in defence at all times; the right back Jim Craig had already ventured forward, and it was he who played the square ball for Gemmell to shoot, with both advancing on the Inter box. He also scored in the 1970 European Cup Final in a defeat to Feyenoord, making him currently one of only three British footballers to score in two different European Cup Finals, the others being Phil Neal of Liverpool and Gareth Bale of Real Madrid.

Gemmell made 418 appearances for Celtic and scored 63 goals. This total comprised 247 league (37 goals), 43 cup (5 goals), 74 league cup (10 goals) and 54 European (12 goals) appearances. His record for penalties was 34 goals from 37 attempts. He placed sixth for the Ballon d'Or in 1967 and 24th in 1968.

In his book, Lion Heart, Gemmell revealed that, during his time at Celtic, he was on the receiving end of sectarian abuse from certain teammates; he and teammate Ian Young had been the target of "a handful" of colleagues who had wanted an all-Catholic team. He also stated that he received verbal abuse on several occasions from some supporters of Old Firm rivals Rangers due to his perceived status as a 'turncoat' (as a Protestant who played for Celtic), such as when attending matches many years after retiring.

Later career

In December 1971, Gemmell transferred to Nottingham Forest to cover for Liam O'Kane. At the end of that season Forest were relegated from the top flight.

In 1973 he had a short stint with the Miami Toros in the North American Soccer League. He returned to Scotland, signing for Dundee in July 1973, and won the 1973 Scottish League Cup Final against former team Celtic. He retired from playing in 1977.

International
Gemmell made his international debut for Scotland against England at Hampden on 2 April 1966. The following year on 15 April, he played in the famous Home Championship match where Scotland recorded a 3–2 victory over World Champions England at Wembley Stadium, ending that team's run of nineteen games without defeat. He won 18 caps and scored one goal from the penalty spot against Cyprus in an 8–0 win in a 1970 World Cup qualifier. Gemmell's final appearance for Scotland came in 1971.

Coaching career
After retiring as a player, Gemmell stayed to manage Dundee from 1 June 1977 to 15 April 1980. He signed Jimmy Johnstone, his former teammate at Celtic, for Dundee.

Gemmell later managed Albion Rovers from 1986–1987 and again from 1993–1994.

Later life and death
In 1994, Gemmell sold his collection of Celtic medals at auction for £32,000; they were purchased by Glasgow businessman Willie Haughey, who has close ties with the club and loaned them back to Celtic to be put on display. He was inducted to the Scottish Football Hall of Fame in 2006.

Gemmell died on 2 March 2017, aged 73, after a long illness. His funeral was held on 10 March with a procession starting from Celtic Park, and was attended by former teammates, serving Celtic manager Brendan Rodgers and Rangers managing director Stewart Robertson.

References

External links 
 profile at Scottish Football Association
 

1943 births
2017 deaths
Scottish footballers
Scotland international footballers
Scottish football managers
Celtic F.C. players
Nottingham Forest F.C. players
Dundee F.C. players
Dundee F.C. managers
Albion Rovers F.C. managers
Scottish Football League players
English Football League players
Footballers from Motherwell
Scottish Football Hall of Fame inductees
Miami Toros players
North American Soccer League (1968–1984) players
Scottish Football League representative players
Association football fullbacks
Scottish Football League managers
Newmains United Community F.C. players
Place of death missing
UEFA Champions League winning players
Scottish expatriate sportspeople in the United States
Expatriate soccer players in the United States
Scottish expatriate footballers